Joseph Martin Pactwa (June 2, 1948 – March 10, 2009) was a professional baseball outfielder and pitcher. He was drafted by the New York Yankees and played in their minor league organization for several years before being released in 1974. Pactwa’s  brief major-league career came with the California Angels during the  season. He got in four games as a pitcher. He was signed as an outfielder but was converted to the mound in 1972. After that, he served as a two-way player in the U.S. minors and in Mexico, where he played both summer and winter ball.
Pactwa was born in Hammond, Indiana.

Pactwa died in Wilmer, Texas, at the age of 60.

See also
1975 California Angels season

References
Joe Pactwa biography at the SABR BioProject
Baseball Almanac

1948 births
2009 deaths
Alijadores de Tampico players
American expatriate baseball players in Mexico
Baseball players from Indiana
Binghamton Triplets players
Broncos de Reynosa players
California Angels players
Charlotte Hornets (baseball) players
Greensboro Yankees players
Gulf Coast Yankees players
Kinston Eagles players
Major League Baseball pitchers
Manchester Yankees players
Mexican League baseball pitchers
Saraperos de Saltillo players
Syracuse Chiefs players
West Haven Yankees players